Holocryptis is a genus of moths of the family Noctuidae erected by Thomas Pennington Lucas in 1893.

Description
Palpi slender and porrect (extending forward). Antennae simple, with thickened basal joint. Thorax and abdomen scaled. Forewings with somewhat lobed inner margin towards base. Vein 5 from above angle of cell, and veins 7, 8 and 9 stalked. Hindwings with costa excised before apex. Veins 3 and 4 stalked, and veins 6 and 7 from upper angle of cell.

Species
 Holocryptis albida Hampson, 1918
 Holocryptis atrifusa Hampson 1910
 Holocryptis bisectalis Walker 1859
 Holocryptis erosides (Hampson, 1902)
 Holocryptis erubescens (Hampson, 1893)
 Holocryptis figurata Warren 1913
 Holocryptis interrogationis Viette, 1957
 Holocryptis melanosticta Hampson, 1910
 Holocryptis neavei D. S. Fletcher, 1961
 Holocryptis nymphula Rebel, 1909
 Holocryptis permaculata Hampson, 1910
 Holocryptis phasianura T. P. Lucas, 1892
 Holocryptis ussuriensis (Rebel, 1901)

References

Acontiinae